Wuhan CTF Finance Center also known as Wuhan Chow Tai Fook Finance Centre is a supertall skyscraper that is planned to be built in Wuhan, Hubei, China. The tower was originally set to be China's tallest, surpassing Shanghai Tower when completed in 2026, but its height was later reduced to 475 meters.

The skyscraper will accommodate office space. The building complex would also include four residential blocks, a three-storey retail space, and basement parking and retail space over five levels. The shopping mall would be under NWD group's K11 brand.

See also
 List of future tallest buildings
 List of tallest buildings in China
 Wuhan Greenland Center
 Wuhan Center

References

Skyscraper office buildings in Wuhan
Skyscraper hotels in Wuhan
Skyscrapers in Wuhan
New World Development